Jorge Manuel Lopes Moreira da Silva, GOIH (born 24 April 1971 in Vila Nova de Famalicão) is a Portuguese politician and an international expert on development, climate change, carbon finance, energy, environment and humanitarian aid. He was a elected Member of the Portuguese Parliament and elected Member of the European Parliament. He was the Minister of Environment, Territorial Planning and Energy from 2013 to 2015 in the government led by Pedro Passos Coelho. From 2016 to 2022 he was Director of the Development Co-operation Directorate at OECD.

As Director of the OECD Development Co-operation Directorate, from 2016 to 2022, he led the Secretariat of the Development Assistance Committee, DAC. During his mandate, the Official Development Assistance, ODA, reached successive all-time highs in 2020 (USD 161 Billion) and 2021 (USD 185 Billion) and he led the design and negotiation of new DAC standards on: Ending Sexual Exploitation, Abuse, and Harassment in Development Co-operation; enhancing coordination of the Humanitarian-Development Nexus; enabling Civil Society; Blended Finance Principles and Guidance; framework on SDG aligned finance; Impact Investing Standards for Financing Sustainable Development; decision to align development co-operation with the goals of the Paris Agreement (that ended new ODA for unabated international thermal coal power generation in 2021). He also led the development of a new development finance measurement tool - Total Official Support for Sustainable Development (TOSSD). During his mandate at OECD he coordinated more than 500 reports in topics such as sustainable development, multilateralism, development finance, blended finance, impact investing, climate change, ocean economy, refugees, fragility, digitalisation, gender equality, trade, illicit financial flows, inequality and poverty, humanitarian aid, Covid-19, debt, democracy and fight against corruption.

As Minister on Environment, Spatial Planning and Energy, from 2013 to 2015, he was responsible for energy, water, waste, spatial planning and housing sector structural reforms in Portugal. Under his leadership Portugal adopted a comprehensive Green Taxation Reform  and the Portuguese Green Growth Commitment. From 2009, to 2012, Moreira da Silva was Senior Environmental Finance Advisor and Program Manager for Climate Change Innovative Finance at the Bureau for Policy Development at UNDP – United Nations Development Programme. At UNDP, he worked on the post-2012 climate change negotiations, on the establishment of innovative financing strategies on climate change and energy, and on the development of climate change market-based mechanisms.

Moreira da Silva has been a visiting professor on development, climate change, energy, environment,humanitarian aid, conflict and fragility and carbon markets at several Portuguese and international universities and institutions, namely Faculdade de Engenharia da Universidade do Porto, Instituto Superior de Ciências Sociais e Políticas (ISCSP) e Sciences Po. He was Member of the European Commission High-Level Group on Research, Innovation, and Science Policy (RISE) and was also a member of the advisory committee of CIRCLE (Climate Impact Research Coordination for a Larger Europe). He served as Senior Advisor to the President of the Portuguese Republic, Consultant to the European Commission and to the European Investment Bank, EIB, Member (elected) of the Portuguese Parliament, Secretary of State on Environment and Spatial Planning at the Portuguese Government, Secretary of State on Science and Higher Education at the Portuguese Government, Member (elected) of the European Parliament, and Vice-President of GLOBE-Europe.

As Member of the European Parliament, he was the Standing Draftsman on climate change and  he authored the Report and the political agreement on the EU GHG Emissions Trading Directive in 2003, the world's largest carbon market.

He is a member of the Social Democratic Party. In April 2010, Jorge Moreira da Silva was elected Vice-President of the national board of the Social Democratic Party and between 2012 and 2016 he was the First Vice-President and Standing Coordinator of the Social Democratic Party, chaired by Pedro Passos Coelho. 

From 1995 to 1998 he was the leader of Juventude Social Democrata, the youth organization of the party. He is also the founder and chairman of the Lisbon-based think-tank Plataforma para o Crescimento Sustentável - Platform for a Sustainable Growth.

Honours
 Commander of the Order of Civil Merit, Spain (11 September 2007)
 Grande Officer of the Order of Prince Henry, Portugal (21 April 2009)

References

External links
OECD Biography
Portuguese Parliament biography
Portuguese Government XX Cabinet - Minister biography
Portuguese Government XIX Cabinet - Minister biography
Portuguese Government XVI Cabinet - composition
Portuguese Government XV Cabinet - composition
European Parliament biography
Platform for Sustainable Growth biography

Living people
1971 births
Social Democratic Party (Portugal) politicians
MEPs for Portugal 1999–2004
Social Democratic Party (Portugal) MEPs
Members of the Assembly of the Republic (Portugal)
People from Vila Nova de Famalicão